The Samsung Intensity series is a line of mobile phone devices produced by Samsung Electronics, all of which are feature phones.

Mobile phones

Mobile phones introduced in 2009
Intensity